EHHADH is a human gene that encodes for a bifunctional enzyme and is one of the four enzymes of the peroxisomal beta-oxidation pathway. Mutations of the gene are a cause of peroxisomal disorders such as Zellweger syndrome.

See also
 HSD17B4

References